Hussein Fahmy (born 22 March 1940) is an Egyptian actor. He worked in the film and television industry for more than 50 years, specializing in film directing and appearing in over 100 film, television, and theatre productions. He graduated from UCLA with a Master of Fine Arts (MFA) degree. Academically he continued to teach at the Academy of Arts (film institute) for twelve years. A leading movie star and the first UNDP Regional Goodwill Ambassador for the Arab States in 1998, Hussein Fahmy is noted for his humanitarian effort. He has worked hard to convey to his audience in the Middle East important human development issues. His contract ended before the Lebanese situation in 2006.

Early life and career
In March 2007, Fahmy was named the first Special Olympics Ambassador for the Middle East North Africa Region. In this role, he will work to create awareness and encourage all members of the community to be involved in the movement. He was also appointed the President of the Cairo International Film Festival (1998–2001). In 2006, he hosted a television show, for the first time in his show business career, Elnas wa Ana aired on the Egyptian television and el-Hayah channel.

Personal life
Hussein Fahmy has been married five times. His first wife was Nadia Moharram, an Egyptian ambassador's daughter, whom he married after his college graduation. The couple had two children. His second wife was the Egyptian actress Mervat Amin (1974–1986), from whom he had their daughter, Menatallah. He later married a computer specialist, Hala Fathy (2001–2007). In 2008, he married the actress Leeka Sewidan whom he divorced in August 2012. Afterwards, he married a Bahraini business woman named Rana Algosaibi (2013–2016).

Filmography
Hussein Fahmy has starred in 112 films throughout his career, from his debut in 1963 to the present.

See also
List of Egyptians
حسين فهمي

References

External links

Egyptian male film actors
Egyptian male television actors
Male actors from Cairo
Egyptian nationalists
United Nations High Commissioner for Refugees Goodwill Ambassadors
1940 births
Living people
Egyptian Muslims